Arnold Šimonek (born 19 September 1990) is a Slovak football striker who plays for OFK 1948 Veľký Lapáš.

External links
FC Nitra profile 

Arnold Šimonek at Futbalnet

1990 births
Living people
People from Nové Zámky
Sportspeople from the Nitra Region
Association football forwards
Slovak footballers
FC Nitra players
FC Vysočina Jihlava players
Manisaspor footballers
Spartak Myjava players
FK Poprad players
OFK 1948 Veľký Lapáš players
Slovak Super Liga players
2. Liga (Slovakia) players
Czech First League players
Czech National Football League players
Slovak expatriate footballers
Expatriate footballers in the Czech Republic
Expatriate footballers in Turkey
Slovak expatriate sportspeople in the Czech Republic
Slovak expatriate sportspeople in Turkey